Resky Fandi Witriawan (born 6 September 1999) is an Indonesian professional footballer who plays as a midfielder for Liga 1 club Persija Jakarta. A versatile player, he has been used in multiple positions, including on the midfield, in winger and at right-back.

International career
On 31 May 2017, Resky made his debut against Brazil U20 as a substitute in the 2017 Toulon Tournament in France. And Resky is one of the players that strengthen Indonesia U19 in 2018 AFC U-19 Championship.

Career statistics

Club

Honours

Club 
Dewa United
 Liga 2 third place (play-offs): 2021

International 
Indonesia U-19
 AFF U-19 Youth Championship third place: 2017, 2018

References

External links
 Resky Witriawan at Soccerway
 Resky Witriawan at Liga Indonesia

1999 births
Living people
Indonesian footballers
People from Makassar
Sportspeople from Makassar
Sportspeople from South Sulawesi
Association football midfielders
Persija Jakarta players
Dewa United F.C. players
PSIS Semarang players
Liga 1 (Indonesia) players
Liga 2 (Indonesia) players
Indonesia youth international footballers
21st-century Indonesian people